Anelka: Misunderstood is a 2020 British-French documentary sports film directed by Éric Hannezo and features interviews with Nicolas Anelka, Franck Nataf, Omar Sy, Arsène Wenger, Thierry Henry, Didier Drogba, and Emmanuel Petit.

Release
Anelka: Misunderstood was released on Netflix on 5 August 2020.

References

External links

 
 
 
 

2020 documentary films
2020 films
2020s sports films
Documentary films about association football
Documentary films about sportspeople
2020s French-language films
Netflix original documentary films
2020s English-language films
2020 multilingual films